Overoraptor (meaning "piebald thief") is a genus of paravian theropod dinosaurs, which was closely related to Rahonavis, from the Late Cretaceous (Cenomanian) Huincul Formation of Gondwana, present-day Argentina. It includes one species, Overoraptor chimentoi.

Etymology 
The generic name Overoraptor is derived from the Spanish overo, meaning piebald, in reference to the color of the fossil bones. The specific name, O. chimentoi, refers to Roberto Nicolás Chimento, who discovered the remains.

Description and classification 
Although the holotype is very fragmentary, it exhibits an unusual combination of features that reveal a novel phylogenetic position. The forelimb exhibits a bird-like morphology that includes, among other things, a robust ulna, while the hindlimb appears to have been adapted for a cursorial lifestyle. A "sickle-claw" similar to that of dromaeosaurs is also present. Both a flight-adapted forelimb and a cursorial hindlimb are present in Rahonavis, also from Gondwana, and the describers suggest the two are closely related taxa. 

The describers ran a phylogenetic analysis and recovered a novel position for Overoraptor and Rahonavis, being outside of Unenlagiidae and Avialae, to which the latter has sometimes been assigned to. Their cladogram is shown below, based on a previous study by Agnolin & Novas (2013):

On the other hand, Cau & Madzia recover a different topology, with unenlagiines falling within Dromaeosauridae, while Troodontidae forms the sister clade to Avialae. Overoraptor and Rahonavis were both recovered as basal avialans, but Rahonavis was found to be more closely to related to the Jurassic Alcmonavis. Their cladogram is shown below:

Paleoenvironment 
Overoraptor was found in the Huincul Formation, a geological unit that has been extensively studied in recent years. Overoraptor lived alongside theropods such as the noasaurid Huinculsaurus, abelisaurids like Skorpiovenator, Ilokelesia and Tralkasaurus, carcharodontosaurids like Mapusaurus and Meraxes, and indeterminate theropods like Gualicho and Aoniraptor. Sauropods were represented by the rebbachisaurids Cathartesaura and Limaysaurus, the titanosaurs Argentinosaurus and Choconsaurus, and some unnamed species. Ornithischians were represented by unnamed iguanodonts.

References 

Prehistoric paravians
Late Cretaceous dinosaurs of South America
Cretaceous Argentina
Fossil taxa described in 2020
Huincul Formation